Department of Community Medicine, St Thomas's Hospital Medical School, London was the foremost centre for public health research in the UK in the 1970s and 1980s. Some of its records are held in The National Archives (United Kingdom).

It was established in 1968 by Walter W. Holland who subsequently obtained core funding from the UK Department of Health to establish the integral interdisciplinary Social Medicine and Health Services Research Unit.  Holland directed the department and unit until 1994.

In the 1980s the medical school merged with Guy's Hospital Medical School and subsequently became part of King's College London.

Publications
Over a period of 26 years this research unit produced numerous influential reports, articles and books on major contemporary health challenges. Examples include:
 Florey, C duV (1983) Introduction to Community Medicine.
 Holland, WW (1986) Oxford Textbook of Public Health
 Murray M, Jarrett, L, Swan AV & R. Rumun (1988). Smoking among young adults 
 Patrick DL & Peach H (1984). Disablement in the community. 
 Peach H & Heller R (1984). Epidemiology of Common Diseases

Notable people
Over the span of its existence a large number of people worked in the centre and many went on to hold senior positions in other institutions. These include:
 
 Douglas Altman (1948-2018): Professor of Statistics in Medicine, University of Oxford
 Roger Beech (d. 2018) - Reader in Health Services Research, Keele University
 Gwyn Bevan, Professor of Management Science, London School of Economics.
 Beulah Bewley (1929-2018), Reader in Public Health, London School of Hygiene & Tropical Medicine
 Peter Burney: Professor of Respiratory Epidemiology and Public Health, Imperial College London. 
 Martin Bland: Professor of Health Statistics, University of York
 John Brazier: Professor of Health Economics and Dean of School of Health and Related Research, University of Sheffield
 Susan Chinn: Professor of Medical Statistics, King's College London
 Sarah Darby: Professor of Medical Statistics, University of Oxford
 Karen Dunnell: UK National Statistician
 Charles du Vé Florey: James Mackenzie Professor of Community Medicine, University of Dundee.
 Richard Heller: Professor of Public Health, University of Manchester 
 Walter W. Holland (1929-2018)- Professor of Public Health Medicine, University of London
 Mark Johnson: Professor of Diversity in Health & Social Care, De Montfort University 
 Joseph Kaufert, Professor of Community Health, University of Manitoba 
 David Locker (d. 2010): Professor of Community Dentistry, University of Toronto 
 Myfanwy Morgan: Professor of Medical Sociology, King's College London
 Richard Morris, Professor of Medical Statistics, University of Bristol 
 Michael Murray: Professor of Social & Health Psychology, Keele University 
 Stephen Palmer: Mansel Talbot Professor of Epidemiology and Public Health, University of Cardiff 
 Donald L Patrick: Professor of Health Services, University of Washington 
 Roberto Rona: Professor of Public Health Medicine, King's College London 
 Ellie Scrivens (1954-2008): Professor of Health Policy, Keele University 
 Tony Swan, Head, Statistics Unit, Public Health Laboratory Service (PHLS), Colindale, London 
 Richard Wiggins: Professor of Quantitative Social Science, UCL Institute of Education

References

Schools of public health
GKT School of Medical Education
Educational institutions established in 1968
1968 establishments in England